Miltonvale Wesleyan College (sometimes called "Miltonvale College") was a two-year college located in Miltonvale, Kansas and was operated by the Wesleyan Church.  The school began operation in 1909 under Rev. Silas W. Bond and ceased operation in 1972, when the school merged with Bartlesville Wesleyan College—later to become a part of Oklahoma Wesleyan University.

Alumni
 Orval Butcher (1917–2010), founding pastor of Skyline Church in La Mesa, California
 Jim Garlow, third pastor of the same Skyline Church.

References

Further reading
 Randall J Stephens, "'A Fortress of Righteousness' on the Kansas Prairie: Miltonvale Wesleyan College, 1909-1972 (MA Thesis, Emporia State University, 1998)

Defunct private universities and colleges in Kansas
Educational institutions established in 1909
Educational institutions disestablished in 1972
Education in Cloud County, Kansas
1909 establishments in Kansas
Oklahoma Wesleyan University
1972 disestablishments in Kansas